A sex kitten is a woman who exhibits a sexually provocative lifestyle or an abundant sexual aggression. The term originated around 1956 in articles in the British and American press and was originally used to describe French actress Brigitte Bardot. Sources believe Bardot's role in Et Dieu... créa la femme (And God Created Woman) was what inspired the term in the mid-1950s.

The 1960s began the era of women embracing their sexuality after moving forward from the idea that women were very unlikely to experience pleasure during sexual activities.

Celebrities 
Ann-Margret was described as a sex kitten in the 1964 film Kitten with a Whip. But, other than Ann-Margret and Brigitte Bardot, the term wasn't associated with any other actresses in Hollywood.

Eartha Kitt, singer of the 1953 Christmas hit "Santa Baby", was also deemed a sex kitten due to some of the lyrics in her song.

The Associated Press stated that the version of Cornelia Wallace in the film George Wallace, portrayed by actress Angelina Jolie, was depicted as "a shallow sex kitten" and therefore Cornelia Wallace had criticism towards the portrayal.

A sex kitten is not always youthful. In various definitions, the sexual attractiveness of a woman is the primary factor of sex kittens, but that did not necessarily mean physical beauty.

See also
Cougar (slang)
Sex symbol
Girl power

References

Physical attractiveness
1950s neologisms
Slang terms for women